Dogura may refer to:

 Asa Dogura, Japanese athlete
 Dogura, Papua New Guinea, a locality in Milne Bay Province, Papua New Guinea

Japanese-language surnames